Holzkirch is a small municipality in the Alb-Donau-Kreis in Baden-Württemberg, Germany. The community belongs to the administration unit Langenau.

Geography
Holzkirch is located on the southern edge of the Swabian Jura north of the Lone valley and north of Ulm.

Neighboring communities
The municipality borders to Weidenstetten, on the east to Neenstetten, in the southeast to Bernstadt, on the south to Breitingen and on the west to Westerstetten.

History
Holzkirch was first documented in 1362 and came 1385 into the possession of the imperial city of Ulm. As Ulm 1803 lost its status, the place came from Ulm to Bavaria. The border between Bavaria and Württemberg in 1810 finally laid down in a contract and Holzkirch became part of Württemberg.

Things

St. Barbara's Church

Buildings
The late Romanesque Barbara Church tower from around 1150 offered around the village for the population protection in troubled times. The very massive cemetery wall was probably for defense.

see also Castle Holzkirch

External links 

Kindergarten Lonetal-Frösche
Homepage der Gemeinde

References

References

Alb-Donau-Kreis
Württemberg
Municipalities in Baden-Württemberg